The KwaZulu-Natal Coastal women's cricket team, previously known as Natal women's cricket team and KwaZulu-Natal women's cricket team, is the women's representative cricket team for part of the South African province of KwaZulu-Natal, based primarily in Durban. They compete in the Women's Provincial Programme and the CSA Women's Provincial T20 Competition. They won the one-day competition in the 2009–10 season.

History
As Natal Women, the side first competed in the Simon Trophy in 1952–53, and played in the tournament until 1971–72. They joined the Inter-Provincial Tournament for its inaugural season in 1995–96, and became known as KwaZulu-Natal in 1997–98. The side became KwaZulu-Natal Coastal in 2019–20, differentiating them from fellow KwaZulu-Natal side KwaZulu-Natal Inland. They have competed in the Provincial One-Day Tournament ever since their first appearance, winning the title once, in 2009–10. That season, they topped the Central Group, winning all eight of their matches, before beating Central Gauteng in the semi-final and then beating Western Province in the final, by four wickets. They have also finished as runners-up in the tournament three times, in 2007–08, 2010–11 and 2013–14. In the 2020–21 season, due to COVID-19 protocols, there was no overall winner, but the side did win one of the two top tier groups, winning three of their four matches.

The side has also competed in the CSA Women's Provincial T20 Competition since its inception in 2012–13. They have finished third in the competition twice, in 2013–14 and 2014–15.

Players

Current squad
Based on squad announced for the 2021–22 season. Players in bold have international caps.

Notable players
Players who have played for KwaZulu-Natal Coastal and played internationally are listed below, in order of first international appearance (given in brackets):

  Jennifer Gove (1960)
  Joy Irwin (1960)
  Eleanor Lambert (1960)
  Yvonne van Mentz (1960)
  Lorna Ward (1960)
  Moira Jones (1972)
  Dawn Moe (1972)
  Rista Stoop (1997)
  Johmari Logtenberg (2003)
  Shandre Fritz (2003)
  Trisha Chetty (2007)
  Olivia Anderson (2008)
  Dinesha Devnarain (2008)
  Chloe Tryon (2010)
  Nadine Moodley (2013)
  Nondumiso Shangase (2019)
  Nonkululeko Mlaba (2019)

Honours
 CSA Women's Provincial Programme:
 Winners (1): 2009–10
 CSA Women's Provincial T20 Competition:
 Winners (0):
 Best finish: 3rd (2013–14 & 2014–15)

See also
 KwaZulu-Natal (cricket team)
 KwaZulu-Natal Inland women's cricket team

References

Women's cricket teams in South Africa
Cricket in KwaZulu-Natal